Prodomitia is a monotypic beetle genus in the family Cerambycidae. Its only species is Prodomitia squamigera. Both the genus and species were described by Karl Jordan in 1894.

References

Lamiini
Beetles described in 1894
Monotypic beetle genera